A happy ending is a type of plot conclusion.

Happy Ending or Happy Endings may also refer to:

Film and television
 Happy Ending (film), a 2014 Bollywood film
 Winter Passing, a 2005 American film released in the UK in 2013 as Happy Endings
 Happy Endings (film), a 2005 film starring Lisa Kudrow
 Happy Endings (1983 film), a film directed by Noel Black
 Happy Endings (TV series), a 2011–2013 American sitcom
 Happy Ending (TV series), a 2012 South Korean television series
 The Happy Ending, a 1969 drama starring Jean Simmons
 The Happy Ending (1931 film), starring George Barraud
 The Happy Ending (1925 film), starring Fay Compton
 Happy Endings?, a 2009 documentary
 Happy Endings, the working title for Inside No. 9
 "Happy Ending" (Schitt's Creek), the series finale of Schitt's Creek

Fiction 
 Happy Endings (novel), a 1996 Doctor Who novel by Paul Cornell
 "Happy Ending" (short story), a 1948 science-fiction story by Henry Kuttner
 "Happy Endings" (short story), a short story by Margaret Atwood
 Happy Ending, a 1957 short story and 1990 anthology by Fredric Brown
 Happy Endings: Tales of a Meaty-Breasted Zilch, a 2007 book by Jim Norton

Music

Albums 
 Happy Ending (Dogstar album), 2000
 Happy Ending (The Phoenix Foundation album), 2007
 Happy Ending (EP), 2016 extended play by South Korean girl group DIA
 Happy Endings (album), a 2017 album by Old Dominion
 Happy Ending, a 1972 album by Terry Riley
 Happy Endings, a 1981 album by Peter Skellern

Songs 
 "Happy Ending" (Joe Jackson song), 1984
 "Happy Ending" (Mika song), 2007
 Happy Ending (Hopsin song), 2017
 "My Happy Ending", by Avril Lavigne from Under My Skin, 2004
 "Happy Ending", by Ayumi Hamasaki from My Story, 2004
 "Happy Ending", by Demi Lovato from Holy Fvck, 2022
 "Happy Endings", by Doris Day from My Heart, 2011
 "Happy Endings", by Pulp from His 'n' Hers, 1994
 "Happy Endings", by The All-American Rejects from the self-titled album, 2003
 "Happy Endings", by the Beach Boys from the film The Telephone, 1988

Other 
 Happy Endings (Jackie Martling album), a 2008 comedy recording
 Happy ending, orgasm as part of erotic massage

See also 
 Happy End (disambiguation)
 Happy ending problem
 Happy Endings Productions, an Irish entertainment television production company